The Unauthorized Beverly Hills, 90210 Story is a 2015 made-for-television movie based on the 1990s television drama Beverly Hills, 90210, directed by Vanessa Parise and produced by Peter M. Green. It was written by Jeffrey Roda. The film follows the creation of the show through its first four seasons, dealing with the relationships between the actors, between the producers Darren Star and Aaron Spelling and the media and fan attention the show brought.

Cast
Dan Castellaneta as Aaron Spelling
Samantha Munro as Shannen Doherty
Abbie Cobb as Jennie Garth
Max Lloyd-Jones as Jason Priestley
David Lennon as Ian Ziering 
Michele Goyns as Gabrielle Carteris
Jesy McKinney as Luke Perry
Ross Linton as Brian Austin Green
Abby Ross as Tori Spelling 
Lini Evans as Candy Spelling 
Adam Korson as Darren Star
Alyssa Lynch as Tiffani-Amber Thiessen (Cameo)

Broadcast
The film premiered on October 3, 2015 on Lifetime and M3.

References

External links

Beverly Hills, 90210 (franchise)
Canadian television films
English-language Canadian films
American films based on actual events
Lifetime (TV network) films
Films set in 1990
2015 films
Films directed by Vanessa Parise
2010s Canadian films